Jiifyarey (Jiif Yarey) is a town in the central Hiran region of Somalia. It's mostly inhabited by the Xawaadle subclan of the larger Hawiye Somali clan

References
Jiif Yarey

Populated places in Hiran, Somalia